Albrecht Metzger (born 1945 in Unteraichen near Stuttgart) is a German journalist, actor, television presenter, film director and cabaretist.

Life and career 
Albrecht Metzger was editor of the SDR youth program Jour Fix and moderator of Diskuss and Teamwörk in the 1970s before he became known to a broader public through the rock music program Rockpalast of the WDR. From 1974 he was the first presenter of the studio broadcasts. Together with Alan Bangs he was the presenter of the long Rockpalast Nacht events, in which he presented the bands with the famous announcement "German television proudly presents – ".
 
In 1977, Metzger moved from Stuttgart to West Berlin and until 1982 played the social worker Rocky in the play  in the children's and youth theatre .

As author and director, Metzger shot more than 40 documentary films for the ARD.

He toured Germany's cabarets with his solo programme .

On every first of the month he moderates the rock music vinyl show Knistern und Rauschen on the internet radio silverdisc.de.

See also
 Peter Rüchel

References

Further reading

External links 

 
 
 www.schwabenoffensive.de
 www.albrecht-metzger.de The homepage of Albrecht Metzger
 www.secondhandcds.de/radio Albrecht Metzger's radio show Knistern und Rauschen

German male stage actors
Male actors from Stuttgart
Male actors from Berlin
20th-century German male actors

German cabaret performers
German television presenters
1945 births
Living people
ARD (broadcaster) people